Imastu is a village in Tapa Parish, Lääne-Viru County, in northern Estonia. Imastu is bordered by the Pärnu–Rakvere road (nr. 5) to the southeast, the Tallinn–Tapa–Narva railway to the northwest and the Valgejõgi River to the southwest.

Imastu Manor
Imastu knight manor was first mentioned in written records in 1447. The present-day building was built in the 1880s by master builder  from Rakvere. It is an eclectic, irregular building with neo-Romanesque details. Ornamental painted ceilings and tiled stoves have been preserved.

References

Villages in Lääne-Viru County
Manor houses in Estonia
Kreis Wierland